USS Dumbarton was a captured steam operated gunboat acquired by the Union Navy from the prize court during the American Civil War. She was used by the Navy to patrol navigable waterways of the Confederacy to prevent the South from trading with other countries.

Service history
Dumbartons first assignment was to search for raider  along the Atlantic coast. She then joined the North Atlantic Blockading Squadron at Beaufort, North Carolina, and served on the blockade of Wilmington, North Carolina until 6 December 1864. After being at Norfolk Navy Yard, Dumbarton served as flagship of Rear Admiral W. Radford in the James River, Virginia from 17 February-27 March 1865. She was out of commission at Washington Navy Yard until 11 November, when she was taken to New York Navy Yard and placed in ordinary. She was sold there on 15 October 1867.

References

Ships of the Union Navy
Steamships of the United States Navy